Bill McMorris (born March 10, 1986) is an American conservative journalist who serves as academic director for the National Journalism Center, and as a contributing editor for The Spectator and The Lamp. He previously served as senior editor of The Washington Free Beacon and has contributed to Watchdog.org. 

He also served as managing editor of Old Dominion Watchdog, a part of the conservative Franklin Center for Government and Public Integrity. He is a former contributor to Illinois Statehouse News.

Biography

McMorris was born in Brooklyn, New York, and raised in Wilton, Connecticut. He attended Cornell University where he received a Bachelor of Arts degree in government and history.

McMorris reported on phantom congressional districts in 2009. He also covered the corruption trial of former Illinois Governor Rod Blagojevich.

He served as a staff writer for the Santa Barbara News-Press and as an editorial intern for the National Journalism Center, a training outfit affiliated with Young America's Foundation. 

McMorris joined the staff of the Franklin Center for Government and Public Integrity in June 2009 as a researcher and investigative reporter. He became an investigative reporter for Watchdog.org in September 2009 when the website was launched. 

He was a 2010 recipient of the Robert Novak Fellowship, sponsored by the Phillips Foundation. He began serving as an academic director for the NJC in 2011. 

He served as managing editor for Virginia Statehouse News beginning in 2011, and transitioned to The Washington Free Beacon as a staff writer in 2012. He became a senior editor there in 2019 and left the publication in 2022.

References

External links
 Old Dominion Watchdog website
 Watchdog.org website
 Franklin Center for Government and Public Integrity website
 Illinois Statehouse News website

1986 births
Living people
American male journalists
Cornell University alumni